From Dusk Till Dawn: Music from the Motion Picture is the soundtrack album for the 1996 action-comedy-horror film, From Dusk till Dawn, directed by Robert Rodriguez and screenplay by Quentin Tarantino.

The album is predominantly Texas blues, featuring such artists as ZZ Top, Stevie Ray Vaughan and Jimmie Vaughan. The film's score was composed by Graeme Revell, and two short excerpts of his work are featured on the album. There are also extracts of dialogue from the film.

The Chicano rock band Tito & Tarantula, who portrayed the band in the Titty Twister bar, appears on the soundtrack as well.

Track listing
 "Everybody Be Cool" – 0:04
Dialogue extract, performed by George Clooney as Seth Gecko
 "Dark Night" (Dave Alvin) – 3:48
Performed by The Blasters
 "Mexican Blackbird " (Billy Gibbons, Dusty Hill, Frank Beard) – 3:03
Performed by ZZ Top
 "Texas Funeral" (David Vaught) – 2:32
Performed by Jon Wayne
 "Foolish Heart" (Raul Malo and Evan York) – 3:32
Performed by The Mavericks
 "Would You Do Me a Favor?" – 0:11
Dialogue extract performed by Juliette Lewis and Quentin Tarantino as Kate Fuller and Richie Gecko
 "Dengue Woman Blues" (Jimmie Vaughan) – 6:23
Performed by Jimmie Vaughan
 "Torquay" (George Tomsco) – 2:41
Performed by The Leftovers
 "She's Just Killing Me" (Billy Gibbons, Dusty Hill, Frank Beard) – 4:55
Performed by ZZ Top
 "Chet's Speech" – 0:42
Dialogue extract performed by Cheech Marin as Chet Pussy
 "Angry Cockroaches (Cucarachas Enojadas)" (Tito Larriva and Peter Atanasoff) – 5:14
Performed by Tito & Tarantula
 "Mary Had a Little Lamb" (Buddy Guy) – 4:15
Performed by Stevie Ray Vaughan and Double Trouble
 "After Dark" (Tito Larriva and Steven Hufsteter) – 4:11
Performed by Tito & Tarantula
 "Willie the Wimp (And His Cadillac Coffin)" (Bill Carter and Ruth Ellsworth) – 4:34
Performed by Stevie Ray Vaughan and Double Trouble
 "Kill the Band" – 0:05
Dialogue extract performed by Tom Savini as Sex Machine
 "Mexican Standoff" (Graeme Revell) – 0:49
 "Sex Machine Attacks" (Graeme Revell) – 1:22
 "Untitled" – 0:28
Hidden track; dialogue extract performed by Cheech Marin as Chet Pussy

Certifications and sales

References

External links

From Dusk Till Dawn at Soundtrack Collector

1990s film soundtrack albums
1996 soundtrack albums
From Dusk till Dawn (franchise)